Yisrael Raul Zinger (born December 18, 1948) is an Israeli politician and former mayor of Ramat Gan (2013-2018).

Biography
Zinger was born in 1948 in Bucharest, Romania. He emigrated to Israel with his family in 1962 and earned a master's degree in nuclear physics in 1978 from Tel Aviv University. In 1985 he was appointed principal of Blich high school, a position he held until 2003. Zinger is married and he has three children.

Political career
In the 2003 elections, Zinger filed candidacy for mayor of Ramat Gan and was elected to the city council. In the 2008 elections, he ran again for the position of mayor. He led the municipal opposition until 2013.

In the 2013 elections, he ran for the third time for mayor of Ramat Gan and against Carmel Shama-Hacohen of Likud, being elected with 52.4% of the vote. His faction won four seats.

On 15 December 2014, Zinger has been placed under house arrest for a week due to corruption suspicions. He had to interrupt his activity at the city hall for two weeks. In 2018 the inquiry was concluded with no proof of guilt. The same year, he lost the position of mayor to Likud's Carmel Shama-Hacohen.

References

External links
 Yisrael Zinger's website 

Living people
1948 births
Mayors of Ramat Gan
Tel Aviv University alumni
Israeli educational theorists
Israeli Jews
Israeli people of Romanian-Jewish descent
Romanian emigrants to Israel